Sorriso Maroto is a Brazilian pagode band originating from Rio de Janeiro, Brazil. It was formed in 1997 by singer and tambourine player Cris Oliveira, and later headed by singer-songwriter Bruno Cardoso. They have released ten albums.

Career
The band was born in 1997 when a group of friends all from Grajaú, a suburb north of Rio de Janeiro, joined and started playing. The band's original lead singer was Cris Oliveira, 23 at the time. In 2002 with the debut album, Sorriso Maroto, the group started being featured on radio and by their second album Por Você they included romantic samba tunes and engaged in a tour with the live album and DVD Por Você: ao Vivo released in 2005 selling well above 120,000 copies. Their follow up album É Diferente in 2006 also resulted in another tour and the live CD and DVD É Diferente: Ao Vivo in 2007 celebrating a decade of career.

After ten years with Deckdisc, the Brazilian record label Som Livre released in 2009 their CD 100% Sorriso Maroto.

With Sinais, came the hit "E Agora Nós?" with a guest performance by Ivete Sangalo. In 2010 Ao Vivo em Recife was released by Universal Music Group as CD, DVD and on Blu-ray, the first for the band. It was recorded on August 7, 2010, at a concert at Marco Zeroo in Recife, in front of tens of thousands, and encompassing the band's biggest hits. On 1 March 2012, the group performed a show at Quinta da Boa Vista, on the birthday of the city of Rio de Janeiro. Album and DVD Sorriso 15 Anos - Ao Vivo celebrated the 15th anniversary of the band, and the participation of several artist in support like Jammil e Uma Noites, Trio Ternura, Coral Resgate, Revelação, Gusttavo Lima, amongst others.

The American musician Brian McKnight, rerecorded a new version of the band's 2002 hit "E Agora Nós?" version of the song retitled "Back at One". Michel Teló recorded "É Nóis Fazê Parapapá" in 2013, giving the band and its singer Bruno Cardoso greater international fame. Also in 2013, the band released Riscos e Certezas, an EP of six tracks. The bonus track "Fofinha Delícia (Excesso de Gostosura)" was used as theme song the soap opera Amor à Vida.

In 2015, their album Sorriso Eu Gosto - Ao Vivo No Maracanãzinho was nominated for the 16th Latin Grammy Awards in the Best Samba/Pagode Album category.

Members
Bruno Cardoso - vocals
Cris Oliveira - tambourine
Sérgio Jr. - guitar
Fred Araújo - surdo (bass drum)
Vinícius Augusto - keyboards

Discography
Studio albums / DVDs

EPs

Live albums / DVDs

Singles

Featured in

References

External links
Official website
Facebook
 

Brazilian musical groups
Musical groups established in 1997
Pagode musical groups